Wolf Coal is an unincorporated community and coal town located in Breathitt County, Kentucky, United States.

References

Unincorporated communities in Breathitt County, Kentucky
Unincorporated communities in Kentucky
Coal towns in Kentucky